Diamicton (also diamict) (from Greek δια (dia-): through and µεικτός (meiktós): mixed) is a terrigenous sediment (a sediment resulting from dry-land erosion) that is unsorted to poorly sorted and contains particles ranging in size from clay to boulders, suspended in an unconsolidated matrix of mud or sand. Today, the word has strong connotations to glaciation but can be used in a variety of geological settings.

The term was proposed by Flint and others as a purely descriptive term, devoid of any reference to a specific origin or depositional environment. Although the term is most commonly applied to unsorted glacial deposits (i.e., glacial till), other processes that create diamictons are solifluction, landslides, debris flows, and turbiditic olistostromes.

Lithified diamicton is referred to as diamictite.

References

External links
 Ice Age Terms 

Sediments